Madison Janssen (born 13 November 1994) is an Australian cyclist. She is a world champion, multiple national champion and a world record holder. In May 2016 she was named as part of the Australian cycling team as the sighted pilot for Jessica Gallagher for the 2016 Summer Paralympics in Rio, where they won a bronze medal in the Women's 1000m time trial.

Personal
Madison Janssen was born in Queensland on 13 November 1994, the youngest of three children. She began BMX riding when she was five years old, after seeing her father and brother playing around on bicycles.

Career
She won national championships in her age division in 2004, 2007 and 2008. She was runner-up at the UCI BMX World Championships in her age division in 2003 in Perth, and 2008 in Taiyuan, China, before winning in the 17 and over division at the 2013 UCI BMX World Championships in Auckland in 2013.

Janssen decided to switch to track cycling. On 18 May 2015, she received a call from Glenn Doney, the head coach at the Victorian Institute of Sport, who informed her that the visually impaired Paralympic athlete and skier Jessica Gallagher intended to qualify for the 2016 Summer Paralympics in Rio de Janeiro as a track cyclist, and needed a tandem bicycle pilot. Janssen later recalled her first ride with Gallagher:

At the national championships in Adelaide in December 2015, they won the women's 1 km tandem event in a time of 1:09.597, inside the 1:10 qualifying time for the world championships. The next step was the 2016 UCI Para-cycling Track World Championships in Montichiari in Italy in March 2016. In the women's tandem 1 km time trial they posted a time of 1:07.575, which was good enough to win bronze. The following day they beat British defending world champions Sophie Thornhill and Helen Scott in the flying 200 m event in a world record time of 11.045 seconds, breaking the record of 11.112 seconds set by Brandie O'Connor and Breanna Hargrave in April 2014. Their selection for the 2016 Summer Paralympics in Rio de Janeiro was announced on 30 May 2016. On 9 September they won a bronze medal in the Women's 1000m time trial.

On 5 March 2017, Janssen came second in the Keirin at the 2017 Australian Track Championships.

At the 2018 UCI Para-cycling Road World Championships, Rio de Janeiro, Brazil, Janssen piloted Jessica Gallagher to silver medals in the Women's Tandem Time Trial and Sprint.

References

External links

BMX Australia Profile

1994 births
Australian female cyclists
BMX riders
Cyclists at the 2016 Summer Paralympics
Cyclists from Queensland
Living people
Paralympic cyclists of Australia
Paralympic sighted guides
Sportswomen from Queensland
Australian track cyclists
20th-century Australian women
21st-century Australian women